Byeong-wuk Lim (born September 30, 1995) is a South Korean professional baseball center fielder currently playing for the Kiwoom Heroes of the KBO League.

Lim was a first-round draft pick in 2014 from Deoksugo with a signing bonus of 200 million Korean won ($180,000) and an annual salary of 24 million won ($22,000) Lim played at shortstop in high school but switched to the outfield with Nexen. He wears number 0 because it resembles the Hangul jamo ㅇ which appears in his name three times.

References

Kiwoom Heroes players
KBO League center fielders
South Korean baseball players
1995 births
Living people